Jack Klugman (April 27, 1922 – December 24, 2012) was an American actor of stage, film, and television.

He began his career in 1950 and started television and film work with roles in 12 Angry Men (1957) and Cry Terror! (1958). During the 1960s, he guest-starred on numerous television series. Klugman won his first Primetime Emmy Award for his guest-starring role on The Defenders in 1964. He also made a total of four appearances on The Twilight Zone from 1960 to 1963. In 1965, Klugman replaced Walter Matthau as Oscar Madison in the Broadway play The Odd Couple. Five years later, he reprised that role in the television adaptation of The Odd Couple opposite Tony Randall. The series aired from 1970 to 1975. Klugman won his second and third Primetime Emmy Awards and a Golden Globe Award for his work on the series. From 1976 to 1983, he starred in the title role in Quincy, M.E., for which he earned four Primetime Emmy Award nominations.

Early life and education
Klugman was born in Philadelphia, the youngest of six children born to Rose, a hat maker, and Max Klugman, a house painter. His parents were Russian-Jewish immigrants. Klugman served in the United States Army during World War II. 

He attended Carnegie Institute of Technology, now Carnegie Mellon University, in Pittsburgh. While there, his drama teacher told him, "Young man, you are not suited to be an actor. You are suited to be a truck driver." After the war, he pursued acting roles in New York City while sharing an apartment with friend, and fellow ex-GI turned actor Charles Bronson.

Career

1950s and 1960s
Klugman was active in numerous stage, television, and film productions during the 1950s and '60s.
In 1950, he had a small role in the Mr. Roberts road company production at the Colonial Theatre in Boston. Later that same year, he made his television debut in an episode of Actors Studio. In March 1952, Klugman made his Broadway debut in Golden Boy as Frank Bonaparte.

In 1954, he played Jim Hanson on the soap opera The Greatest Gift. The following year, he appeared in the live television broadcast of Producers' Showcase in the episode "The Petrified Forest" with Humphrey Bogart and Henry Fonda. Klugman later said the experience was the greatest thrill of his career. He went on to appear in several classic films, including as juror number five in 12 Angry Men (1957), of which he was the last surviving cast member. In 1959, he returned to Broadway in the original production of Gypsy: A Musical Fable. In 1960, Klugman was nominated for a Tony Award for Best Featured Actor (Musical) for his role in the show but lost to Tom Bosley in Fiorello!. He remained with Gypsy until it closed in March 1961.

From 1960 to 1963, Klugman appeared in four episodes of The Twilight Zone series: "A Passage for Trumpet" (1960), "A Game of Pool" (1961), "Death Ship" (1963), and "In Praise of Pip" (1963), tying Burgess Meredith for the most appearances in a starring role on the series. In 1964, he won his first Primetime Emmy Award for his guest-starring role on The Defenders. The same year, Klugman was cast in the starring role in the situation comedy Harris Against the World. The series was a part of an experimental block of sitcoms that aired on NBC entitled 90 Bristol Court. Harris Against the World, along with the other sitcoms that aired in the block, were cancelled the following year due to low ratings.

Klugman continued the decade with multiple guest roles on television, including appearances on The F.B.I., Ben Casey, The Name of the Game, The Fugitive, and Insight. He also appeared on Broadway in Tchin-Tchin from October 1962 to May 1963.  From 1960 to 1963, Klugman appeared in two episodes of the series The Untouchables: "Loophole" (1961) and "An Eye for an Eye" (1963).

The Odd Couple

In 1965, Klugman replaced Walter Matthau in the lead role of Oscar Madison in the original Broadway production of The Odd Couple. He reprised the role when the play was adapted as a television series, which was broadcast on ABC from 1970 to 1975. Over the course of the show's five-year, 114-episode run, Klugman won two Primetime Emmy Awards for his work on the series. In 1973, during the run of the series, Klugman and Odd Couple co-star Randall recorded an album titled The Odd Couple Sings for London Records. Roland Shaw and The London Festival Orchestra and Chorus provided the music and additional vocals.

1970s and 1980s
After the cancellation of The Odd Couple in 1975, Klugman returned to television in 1976 in Quincy, M.E., initially broadcast as part of the NBC Mystery Movie umbrella series, before becoming a weekly program. Klugman portrayed Dr. Quincy, a forensic pathologist who worked for the Los Angeles County Coroner's Office and solved crimes. He was nominated for four Primetime Emmy Awards for his work on the series and also wrote four episodes. A total of 148 episodes of Quincy aired over eight seasons, ending in 1983. In 1984, Klugman starred in Lyndon, a one-man show based on Prideaux's script, inspired in part by Merle Miller's taped conversations and directed by George Schaefer. In 1986, Klugman starred in the sitcom You Again? co-starring John Stamos as Klugman's character's son. The series was broadcast on NBC for two seasons before being cancelled. During the show's run, Klugman also appeared on Broadway in I'm Not Rappaport. The show closed in 1988. The following year, he co-starred in the television miniseries Around the World in 80 Days.

1990s to 2010s
In 1989, Klugman's throat cancer (with which he was first diagnosed in 1974) returned. His illness sidelined his career for the next four years. He returned to acting in a 1993 Broadway revival of Three Men on a Horse, with Tony Randall. That same year, he again reunited with Tony Randall in the television film The Odd Couple: Together Again. The next year, Klugman co-starred in the television film Parallel Lives.

In 1993, he appeared on a special "celebrity versus regulars" version of the British quiz show Going for Gold, emerging as the series winner.

In 1996, he co-starred in The Twilight of the Golds and the comedy film Dear God. He resumed his television career with guest appearances on Diagnosis: Murder. He also starred in The Outer Limits episode "Glitch" and appeared in an episode of the TV series Crossing Jordan. Klugman starred in both the 1997 Broadway revival and the 2007 off-Broadway revival of The Sunshine Boys.

In 2005, Klugman co-starred in the comedy film When Do We Eat?. That same year, he published Tony and Me: A Story of Friendship, a book about his long friendship with his The Odd Couple co-star Tony Randall. Klugman gave the eulogy at Randall's memorial service in 2004. A fan of the New York Mets (whose cap he wore as Oscar Madison), Klugman started an MLB.com PRO Blog called Klugman's Korner to talk about baseball and Randall.

In 2008, he sued NBC Television over missing profits from his show Quincy M.E. The lawsuit was filed in California state court, with Klugman requesting NBC to show him the original contract. Klugman argued that his production company, Sweater Productions, should have received 25% of the show's net profits. NBC Universal and Klugman settled the lawsuit on undisclosed terms in August 2010.

His last on-screen role was in the 2010 horror film Camera Obscura. Klugman was originally supposed to play Juror #9 in a stage production of Twelve Angry Men at the George Street Playhouse that was set to open on March 13, 2012. However, he had to withdraw from the production because of illness.

Personal life

Marriage and children

Klugman married actress Brett Somers in 1953. The couple had two children, Adam (who had a cameo as Oscar Madison as a child in a flashback on The Odd Couple) and David. He had a stepdaughter, Leslie Klein, from Somers's first marriage. (Klein was married to Jim Fyfe, an actor and theater director.) The couple separated in 1974 and divorced in August 1977; they did not make their divorce public. In 2007, Somers died from cancer at age 83. Because Klugman did not remarry until after Somers died (nor did Somers ever remarry), it was erroneously reported that the two had remained married but separated for the rest of Somers's life.

Klugman's 18-year relationship with actress Barbara Neugass ended in 1992 and led to a palimony suit that Neugass ultimately lost.

Klugman began living with Peggy Crosby in 1988. They married in February 2008, shortly after Somers's death.

Business interests
Klugman was an avid Thoroughbred racing fan. He owned Jaklin Klugman, who finished third in the 1980 Kentucky Derby behind the great filly Genuine Risk and Grade 1 stakes winner Akinemod. Klugman said Jaklin Klugman's success was the biggest thrill of his life. His farm where he kept up to 100 horses was called El Rancho De Jaklin named after his horse.

In the 1980s, Klugman licensed his name for use by a popcorn franchise named "Jack's Corn Crib".

Health and death
Klugman was diagnosed with throat cancer in 1974. In 1988, he lost a vocal cord to throat cancer surgery but continued to act on stage and television, though he was left with a quiet, raspy voice. In later years subsequent to his operation, he regained limited strength in his voice.

Klugman died from prostate cancer at his home in Woodland Hills, Los Angeles on December 24, 2012, aged 90. A New York Times profile described him as an "extraordinary actor ennobling the ordinary." His obituary in the Huffington Post referred to him as a "character actor titan." Klugman's ashes were interred in a columbarium at Westwood Memorial Park cemetery in Los Angeles.

Stage credits

Filmography

Awards and nominations

References

External links

 
 
 
 
 Jack Klugman profile
 Jack Klugman's Blog
 Jack Klugman – Jack Klugman Informationscenter Europe
 
 Jack Klugman Radio interview w/Doug Miles Part 2
 The Odd Couple: A Hot Tip at Sportsillustrated.cnn.com
 Jack Klugman interview at Archive of American Television
 Jack Klugman Interview Part 1 of 5 Frequency.com

1922 births
2012 deaths
20th-century American male actors
21st-century American male actors
American male film actors
United States Army personnel of World War II
American people of Russian-Jewish descent
American racehorse owners and breeders
American male screenwriters
American male stage actors
American male television actors
Best Musical or Comedy Actor Golden Globe (television) winners
Burials at Westwood Village Memorial Park Cemetery
Deaths from cancer in California
Carnegie Mellon University College of Fine Arts alumni
Deaths from prostate cancer
Outstanding Performance by a Lead Actor in a Comedy Series Primetime Emmy Award winners
Outstanding Performance by a Lead Actor in a Miniseries or Movie Primetime Emmy Award winners
Jewish American male actors
Male actors from Philadelphia
People from Rockland County, New York
United States Army soldiers
Jewish American military personnel
Screenwriters from New York (state)